Décibels radio was a French local radio station stream in the city of Besançon (Doubs, Franche-Comté).

History 
Décibels radio  was created in the 1980s in the French city of Besançon and was located in Cologne street, in the area of Planoise. For a long time the station played popular songs, but in the 2000s, they also played house music and techno. Décibels radio lost its frequency in 2006 and disappeared in 2008. It was replaced by FG DJ Radio.

See also 
 South radio
 France Bleu

References

Planoise
Radio France
Mass media in Besançon